Paul Watters is an Australian academic. He is Academic Dean at AAPoly, Honorary Professor at Macquarie University, and Adjunct Professor at La Trobe University. Professor Watters has made significant research contributions to cybercrime detection and prevention, including phishing, malware, piracy and child exploitation.

References 

Year of birth missing (living people)
Living people
Academic staff of Macquarie University